StarCraft II Proleague, also known as StarCraft Proleague or Proleague for short, was the longest running StarCraft league in the world and the most prestigious team league. Hosted by the Korean eSports Association (KeSPA), the league was played offline in South Korea. Proleague began in 2003 with the game StarCraft: Brood War before switching over to StarCraft II in 2011 and then discontinued in 2016. It was broadcast by SPOTVGames prior to being discontinued.

History 
In 2003, the game broadcasting company MBCGame created the KPGA Team League, the first major team league in StarCraft professional competition. MBCGame's competitor, OnGameNet created their own team league in response and so two major team leagues were active in the early 2000s.

In 2005, KeSPA merged the two team leagues to create the Proleague, a unified league. SK Telecom T1 swept the first two rounds of the newly formed league and ended up winning the grand finals as well to be the first champion. From its inception, the Proleague format had the teams alternate between 1vs1 and 2vs2 games in a best of five or best of seven match. However, the 2vs2 matches were discontinued in 2008, leaving only 1vs1 games. After the 2008 season, the format of Proleague changed again to span a longer portion of the year, typically starting from the end of one year and ending in the Fall of the next. The 2009 – 2010 season led to the creation of the modern Proleague format where teams face off each other in four or five rounds of round robin. At the end of the season, the highest scoring teams face off in a single-elimination playoffs bracket to determine the champion.

Prior to the release of StarCraft II in 2010, Blizzard Entertainment, disputed with KeSPA over intellectual property rights of broadcasting StarCraft games. This put pressure on KeSPA and in 2011 the case was resolved with an eSports commentator noting that the case was a push to expand the broadcasting market into StarCraft II. The 2011 – 2012 Proleague ended up being a transitional season for the league as featured both Brood War and Wings of Liberty. Each match was played alternating between Brood War and Wings of Liberty, with each player having to prepare for both games as well. Following the closure of MBCGame in 2012, SPOTVGames broadcast Proleague alongside OnGameNet.

The full transition into StarCraft II came into place for the 2012 – 2013 season which also featured EG-TL, a partnership between rivals Team Liquid and Evil Geniuses which made them the first non-Korean team to play in Proleague. EG-TL did not achieve much success in Proleague and ultimately pulled out of the league in the following season. OnGameNet stopped broadcasting Proleague starting the 2013 – 2014 season, leaving SPOTVGames as the sole broadcaster for the league.

KeSPA announced on October 18, 2016, that Proleague would be discontinued citing sponsorship issues, declining amount of professional teams, and match fixing scandals.

Tournaments

OnGameNet and MBCGame Leagues 
MBCGame hosted their first major team league in 2003.

OnGameNet also hosted their own team competitions in 2003 and 2004.

United League 
OnGameNet and MBCGame came together to host Proleague starting in 2005.

Hybrid League 

Prior to the switch to StarCraft II, the 2011 – 2012 SK Planet Proleague Season 2 league featured both games.

StarCraft II Leagues 
Proleague fully switched to StarCraft II starting with the 2012 – 2013 season.

Teams 
For the 2016 season, the final season, there were 7 teams in Proleague.

 CJ Entus
 Jin Air Green Wings
 KT Rolster
 MVP (Korean)
 Samsung Galaxy
 Afreeca Freecs (Korean)
 SK Telecom T1

Prize Pool 
The prize pool for the grand finals of the 2014 – 2015 Proleague season was a total of 70,000,000 KRW. In addition, each round had its own separate prize pool and additional awards were given out to outstanding players.

See also 
 eSports
 Professional StarCraft competition
 KeSPA
 OnGameNet
 MBCGame
 SPOTV

External links 
Official Site
Official Facebook Page

References 

StarCraft competitions
Esports competitions in South Korea
2003 establishments in South Korea